The Buddhist Tantras are a varied group of Indian and Tibetan texts which outline unique views and practices of the Buddhist tantra religious systems.

Overview
Buddhist Tantric texts began appearing in the Gupta Empire period, though there are texts with elements associated with Tantra that can be seen as early as the third century. By the eighth century, Tantra was a dominant force in North India and the number of texts increased with numerous Tantric pandits writing commentaries.

The earliest known datable Buddhist Tantra is possibly the Mahavairocana Tantra, which was mentioned and collected by the Chinese pilgrim Wu-xing (無行) c. 680 CE.

Some of the material is also similar to content in the Yoga Upanishads. Buddhist Tantric traditions were variously influenced by Śaiva and Pancharatra Hindu traditions, local god/goddess cults, Yaksha or nāga rites, as well as drawing on pre-existing Mahāyāna Buddhist ideas and practices.

Many early Buddhist Tantric texts, later termed “action Tantras” (kriyā tantra), are mostly collections of magical mantras or phrases for mostly worldly ends called mantrakalpas (mantra manuals) and they do not call themselves Tantras. Later Tantric texts from the eighth century onward (termed variously Yogatantra, Mahayoga, and Yogini Tantras) advocated union with a deity (deity yoga), sacred sounds (mantras), techniques for manipulation of the subtle body and other secret methods with which to achieve swift Buddhahood. Some Tantras contain antinomian and transgressive practices such as ingesting alcohol and other forbidden substances as well as sexual rituals. Some of the unique themes and ideas found in the Buddhist Tantras is the revaluation of the body and its use in attaining great bliss (mahasukha), a revaluation of the role of women and female deities, and a revaluation of negative mental states, which can be used in the service of liberation as the Hevajra Tantra says "the world is bound by passion, also by passion it is released".

Buddhist Tantra quickly spread out of India into nearby countries like Tibet and Nepal in the eighth century, as well as to Southeast Asia. Buddhist Tantra arrived in China during the Tang Dynasty (where it was known as Tangmi) and was brought to Japan by Kukai (774–835), where it is known as Shingon. It remains the main Buddhist tradition in Nepal, Mongolia and Tibet where it is known as Vajrayana.

There are between 1500 and 2000 surviving Indian Buddhist Tantric texts in the original Sanskrit, and over 2000 more Tantras solely survive in translation (mostly Tibetan or Chinese). In the Tibetan canons, there are 450 Tantras in the Kanjur collection and 2400 in the Tengyur.

Tibetan categorization
Tantric texts were brought to Tibet in two historical periods, the eighth century and the 11th century. The ancient translation school, or Nyingma and the later New translation schools organize Tantras into different categories.

Ancient Translation School
The Nyingma tantra collection is known as the Nyingma Gyubum and has six tantra categories:
 Three Outer Tantras:
 Kriyayoga
 Charyayoga
 Yogatantra
 Three Inner Tantras, which correspond to the Anuttarayogatantra:
 Mahayoga
 Anuyoga
 Atiyoga (Tib. Dzogchen), further divided into three classes:
 Mental Semde
 Spatial Longdé
 Esoteric Instructional Mengagde

New Translation Schools
The Sarma or New Translation schools of Tibetan Buddhism (Gelug, Sakya, and Kagyu) divide the Tantras into four categories:

 Kriyayoga
 Charyayoga
 Yogatantra
 Anuttarayogatantra 
Mother tantras, Yogini tantras
Father tantras
Nondual Tantra or Advaya Class

List of Buddhist Tantric texts

Many Tantric texts have titles other than 'Tantra', including Dharani, Kalpa, Rajñi, stotra, doha and sutra. The Major Tantras also accumulated secondary literature, such as 'Explanatory Tantras' (vyākhyātantra), commentaries and sadhana literature. Major Buddhist Tantric texts include:

Guhyasamāja Tantra, Father Tantra class, (c. 5th–8th century)
Mahavairocana Tantra, Charya Tantra class, (7th century)
Vajrapãṇyabhiṣeka Tantra
Vajrasekhara Sutra
Tattvasaṃgraha Tantra, Yogatantra class, (7th century)
Hevajra Tantra, Mother class, (8th century)
Cakrasaṃvara Tantra a.k.a. Sri-Heruka-bhidhana, Mother class (8th century)
Guhyagarbha tantra, Mother class  
Sarvabuddha Samayoga, Mother class
Vajramrta Tantra, Mother class
Vajrapañjara Tantra, Mother class
Vajrabhairava Tantra or Yamantaka Tantra, Father class, (8th century)
Mañjuśrī-mūla-kalpa (8th century)
Shurangama Sutra (8th century)
Shurangama Mantra
Susiddhikāra-sūtra (8th century)
Sarva-tathāgata-tattva-saṅgraha-sūtra (8th century)
Kurukullā Tantra	
Mahākāla Tantra		
Samvarodaya Tantra	
Vajrapatala Tantra
Sri-Vajriimrta-tantra
Mañjuśrīnāmasamgīti, Nondual class
Mahachinacara Tantra
Mayajala Tantra 
The Eighteen Texts of the Mind Series (Semde) (9th century)
Kulayarāja Tantra - "The All Creating King"	 
Kalachakra Tantra, Nondual class (mid-11th century)
Seven texts of Space series (11th–14th centuries)
Mahāvarntaprasaranirajatantranāma - "Samantabhadra’s Royal Tantra of All-Inclusive Vastness" 
Seventeen Tantras of Menngagde, Dzogchen (11th–14th centuries)
Saṃvara Tantra  
Mahamaya Tantra	
Vajrayogini Tantra
Sarvarahasya Tantra
Sri-Paramadya-Tantra
Nīlakaṇṭha Dhāraṇī or Mahākaruṇā Dhāraṇī, popularly known as the 'Great Compassion Mantra'
Chandamaharosana Tantra	  
Prajnopaya-viniscaya Siddhi	
Naro Chos-Drug	
Nigu Chos-Drug	
Mila Gnubum	
Sutra of Secret Bliss (Tachikawa-ryu, c.1114)
Kalika Purana		
Padma Kathang Sanglingma		
Bardo Thödol (1326–1386)		
Nyingtig Yabshi	
Seven Treasures		
Padma Kathang Sheldrakma	
Longchen Nyingthig	
Yuthok Nyingthig
Rinchen Terzö Chenmo

Tantric authors
As Buddhist Tantra became more widely practiced in the middle of the seventh century, pandits at mainstream Buddhist scholastic institutions began to adopt the practices and write sadhanas and commentaries on Vajrayana praxis. Benoytosh Bhattacharyya notes that there are two main chronological lists of prominent Tantric authors, the first from Taranatha's works and the second from Kazi Dawasamdup's introduction to the Cakrasaṃvara Tantra.

Taranatha's list:
Padmavajra (c.693), author of the Guhyasiddhi
Anangavajra (c.705), author of the Prajñopāyaviniścayasiddhi
Indrabhuti (c.717), author of the Jñānasiddhi
Bhagavati Laksmi (c.729), female author of the Advayasiddhi
Lilavajra (c.741)
Darikapa (c.753)
Sahajayogini (c.765)
Dombi Heruka (c.777)

Kazi Dawasamdup's list:

Saraha aka Rahulabhadra (c. 633)
Nagarjuna (author of the Pañcakrama c. 645, not to be confused with the Madhyamika philosopher)
Sabaripa (c.657)
Luipa (c.669)
Vajraghanta (c.681)
Kacchapa (c.693)
Jalandharipa (c.705)
Krsnacarya (c.717)
Guhya (c.729)
Vijayapa (c.741)
Tilopa
Naropa

Other Indian tantric authors include:
Buddhaguhya, wrote a commentary on the Mahavairocana Tantra
Vimalamitra, 8th century, wrote commentaries on the Guhyagarbha tantra
Padmasambhava
Śāntarakṣita (725–788), whose authorship of the Tantric work Tattvasiddhi is attributed by various authors, but this is debated by scholars such as Ernst Steinkellner.
Vilāsavajra, 8-9th century author of the Namamantrarthavalokini, a commentary on the Mañjuśrīnāmasamgīti.
Buddhajñāna, 8-9th century author of the Śrīherukasādhanavṛtti
Aryadeva, author of the Lamp that Integrates the Practices (Caryamelapakapradipa), a commentary on the Guhyasamāja Tantra, not to be confused with the Madhyamaka philosopher of the same name
Candrakirti, 9th century author of the Pradipoddyotana, not to be confused with the Madhyamaka philosopher of the same name
Sakyamitra, commentator on the Guhyasamāja Tantra
Nagabodhi, commentator on the Guhyasamāja Tantra
Bhavyakīrti, 10th century author of a commentary on the Cakrasaṃvara Tantra, the Śrīcakrasamvarapañjikā-śūramanojñā-nāma.
Sraddhakaravarman, commentator on the Guhyasamāja 
Bhavabhaṭṭa, 10th century author of the Śrīcakrasaṁvarapañjikā, a Cakrasamvāratantra commentary 
Jayabhadra, Cakrasamvāratantra commentator
Durjayacandra, Cakrasamvāratantra commentator
Vajrapani, Cakrasamvāratantra commentator
Tathagataraksita, Cakrasamvāratantra commentator
Bhavabadra, Cakrasamvāratantra commentator
Viravajra, Cakrasamvāratantra commentator
Manibhadra, Cakrasamvāratantra commentator
Śraddhākaravarma, Guhyasamāja commentator
Prasantajnana, Guhyasamāja commentator
Vimalagupta, Guhyasamāja commentator
Cilupa, Guhyasamāja commentator
Vajrahasa, Guhyasamāja commentator
Santipa
Kāṇha, author of the Yogaratnamālā on the Hevajra Tantra 
Bhadrapāda, author of the Śrīhevajravyākhyākhyāvivaraṇa, on the Hevajra Tantra
Vajragarbha, author of the Ṣaṭsāhasrikā-Hevajra-ṭīkā
Ratnakīrti, 11th century
Ratnākaraśānti, wrote the Muktāvalī, a commentary on the Hevajra
Pundarika, a commentator of the Kalachakra tantra
Sucandra, Kalacakra commentary in sixty thousand stanzas
Yogaratnamālā, author of a commentary on the Hevajra Tantra
Abhayakaragupta, 11th-early 12th century CE.

See also

Footnotes

External links 
 84000: Translating the Words of the Buddha
 Digital Sanskrit Buddhist Canon

 
Buddhist tantras